Indragiri Hulu ( or Upper Indragiri) is a regency (kabupaten) of Riau, Indonesia. It is located on the island of Sumatra. The regency has an area of 8,198.71 km2 and had a population of 363,442 at the 2010 census, 408,704 at the 2015 census and 444,548 at the 2020 census.

The seat of the regency is located at Rengat.

Administrative districts
The regency is divided into fourteen districts (kecamatan), listed below with their areas and their populations at the 2010 census and the 2020 census. The table also includes the locations of the district administrative centres, and the number of villages (rural desa and urban keluraham) in each district.

Note: (a) the area of this district is still included in the figures for the district from which it was cut out.

References

 
Regencies of Riau